Dongxiayuan station is a station on Line 6 of the Beijing Subway. The construction of this station began on September 20, 2012, and was completed in 2014.

Station Layout 
The station has an underground island platform.

Exits 
There are 3 exits, lettered A, B, and D. Exit B is accessible.

References

External links
 

Beijing Subway stations in Tongzhou District
Railway stations in China opened in 2014